The Pacific Handball Cup is the official competition for senior national handball teams of Oceania, where dependent territories of other countries such as New Caledonia, Tahiti and Wallis and Futuna (France); America Samoa and Guam (United States); and the Marshall Islands, who are ineligible for International Handball Federation (IHF) world championship events, compete against Oceania nations. This is organised by the Oceania Continent Handball Federation (OCHF).

Men's tournament

Women's tournament

See also 
 French Pacific Handball Championship

External links 
 Handball Oceania Archive on Todor66.com
 Oceania archive on Les Sport Info (French)
 Oceania Continent Handball Federation webpage

 
Handball competitions in Oceania